Chamni is a district (amphoe) in the central part of Buriram province, northeastern Thailand.

Geography
Neighboring districts are (from the north clockwise) Lam Plai Mat, Mueang Buriram, Nang Rong, Nong Ki and Nong Hong of Buriram Province.

History
The minor district (king amphoe) was created on 1 April 1992, when the five tambons: Chamni, Cho Phaka, Laluat, Mueang Yang, and Nong Plong were split off from Nang Rong district. It was upgraded to a full district on 5 December 1996.

Motto
The Chamni District's motto is "The three brook city, have many fish, jasmine rice, Chamnit Buddha image."

Administration
The district is divided into six sub-districts (tambons), which are further subdivided into 64 villages (mubans). There are no municipal (thesaban) areas, and six tambon administrative organizations (TAO).

References

External links
amphoe.com
 

Chamni